Sesarethus was an ancient city in southern Illyria. Stephanus of Byzantium from the 6th century AD reports, citing Hecataeus (6th century BC), that Sesarethos was a Taulantian city, and that Sesarethioi was its ethnicon. The city and the tribal name Sessarethes have been related by modern scholars to the Illyrian tribe of Dassaretii. The variant Sesarethii is also mentioned by Strabo (1st century BC – 1st century AD) as an alternative name of the Enchelei.

See also 
 List of settlements in Illyria

References

Bibliography 

Cities in ancient Illyria
Illyrian Albania
Former populated places in the Balkans